Astor is a German surname. Notable people with the surname include:

Annabel Astor, Viscountess Astor (born 1948), British businesswoman
Ava Alice Muriel Astor (1902–56), daughter of John Jacob Astor IV
Bronwen Astor, Viscountess Astor (1930–2017), British model
Brooke Astor (19022007), American philanthropist
Caroline Schermerhorn Astor (18301908), American socialite
David Astor (19122001), British newspaper publisher
Gavin Astor, 2nd Baron Astor of Hever (191884), British publisher
Irene Astor, Baroness Astor of Hever (19192001), British philanthropist
Jakie Astor (19182000), British politician
John Astor (192387), British politician
John Astor, 3rd Baron Astor of Hever (born 1946), British politician
John Jacob Astor (17631848), German fur-trader and first multi-millionaire of America
John Jacob Astor III (182290), financier
John Jacob Astor IV (1864–1912), richest passenger on the RMS Titanic
John Jacob Astor VI (191292), son of John Jacob Astor IV and Madeleine Astor
John Jacob Astor, 1st Baron Astor of Hever (1886–1971), British politician
Liz Astor, Baroness Astor of Hever (born 1950), British author
Madeleine Astor (18931940), wife of John Jacob Astor IV
Mary Astor (190687), Academy Award-winning American actress
Michael Astor (191680), British Conservative Party politician
Nancy Astor, Viscountess Astor (18791964), first woman to serve as a British Member of Parliament
Violet Astor, Baroness Astor of Hever (18891965), British aristocrat
Vincent Astor (18911959), American businessman and philanthropist
Waldorf Astor, 2nd Viscount Astor (1879–1952), politician and newspaper proprietor
William Astor, 3rd Viscount Astor (190766), British Conservative Party politician
William Astor, 4th Viscount Astor (born 1951), British politician
William Backhouse Astor Sr. (17921875), businessman
William Backhouse Astor Jr., (182992), businessman
William Waldorf Astor, 1st Viscount Astor (18481919), attorney

German-language surnames